The University of Texas Rio Grande Valley School of Medicine is a public medical school of University of Texas Rio Grande Valley located in Edinburg, Texas. It is in the preliminary stages of being accredited by the Liaison Committee on Medical Education (LCME). The UTRGV School of Medicine was established by the Texas Legislature in May 2013. The medical school enrolled its first class of 50 first-year medical students in the fall of 2016.

History
On February 14, 2014, The University of Texas System announced Dr. Francisco Fernandez as the founding dean of the UTRGV School of Medicine

On July 10, 2014, University of Texas Board of Regents unanimously approved the establishment of a doctor of medicine degree.

References

External links

 

Medicine
Medical schools in Texas